Lebia cruxminor is a species of ground beetle in the Harpalinae subfamily.

Description
Their color is orange and black. They were first photographed on 30 March 2002, by a Russian entomologist Oleg Berlov, in Irkutsk, Russia.

Distribution
Eurasia, North Africa.
The species can be found in Irkutsk, Russia, and various German towns such as: Kulbach district of Bavaria, and Upper Franconia.

References

Lebia
Beetles described in 1758
Beetles of Europe
Taxa named by Carl Linnaeus